Mother Russia is a national personification of Russia.

Mother Russia may also refer to:
 "Mother Russia" (Fe song)
 "Mother Russia" (Renaissance song)
 Mother Russia (audio drama), an audio drama based on the British television series Doctor Who
 "Dominion/Mother Russia", a song by The Sisters of Mercy
 "Mother Russia", a song from the Iron Maiden album No Prayer for the Dying
 "Mother Russia", a villain from the comic book series Kick-Ass 2.
 Mother Russia Bleeds, a 2016 video game